Mu Sigma Phi may refer to:

 Clariosophic Society, also known as Mu Sigma Phi (literary society)
 Mu Sigma Phi (medical fraternity) in the Philippines
 Mu Sigma Phi (sorority) in the Philippines